Lahot also called Gamong is a traditional Filipino ethnic Moro weapon.
It is a long, thin one handed sword designed for slashing and thrusting. The length is about 24-28 inches. The design of the hilt is a typical hook to prevent slipping when wet.

References

Filipino swords